Isoka is a constituency of the National Assembly of Zambia. It covers the towns of Chisato, Isoka, Mpangala and Papote in Isoka District of Muchinga Province.

Known as Isoka West from 1983, the constituency was renamed Isoka in 2011.

List of MPs

References

Constituencies of the National Assembly of Zambia
1964 establishments in Zambia
Constituencies established in 1964